Sabbir Khan is an Indian film director and screenwriter.

Early life 
Khan's mother died when he was very young, and his father was a lyricist in the late 1960s and early 1970s. He worked in advertising before he became a film director.

He made his directorial debut with Kambakkht Ishq, a 2009 Indian Hindi-language romantic comedy film produced by Sajid Nadiadwala. The film was based on the 2002 Tamil film, Pammal K. Sambandam. It featured Akshay Kumar and Kareena Kapoor in the lead roles, along with Aftab Shivdasani and Amrita Arora in supporting roles. Hollywood actors Sylvester Stallone, Denise Richards, Brandon Routh, and Holly Valance appeared in cameos, playing themselves. The film was released worldwide on July 3rd 2009. 

Sabbir Khan then directed Heropanti. It was a remake of the 2008 Telugu romantic drama, Parugu. It starred Tiger Shroff and Kriti Sanon in their Hindi film debuts, alongside Prakash Raj in a supporting role. The film was released Worldwide on May 23rd 2014. It earned over 780 million INR worldwide and over 529 million Indian Rupees nett domestically in India.

Sabbir Khan's next was Baaghi. It was produced by Sajid Nadiadwala, under Nadiadwala Grandson Entertainment. It was third successive film with Khan. It starred Tiger Shroff, Shraddha Kapoor, and Sudheer Babu, in his Hindi debut, in the main leads. It also had Sunil Grover in a supporting role. It earned over 1.27 billion INR worldwide, becoming a big hit and major commercial success.

Khan reunited with Tiger Shroff, for the third time, for Munna Michael, starring Nidhi Agerwal and Nawazuudin Siddiqui in the lead roles. It was produced by Viki Rajani and Eros International. The film was released on 21 July 2017. Nidhi Agarwal got Zee Cine Award for Best Female Debut. Tiger Shroff's dancing skills and action were highly appreciated, along with Nawazuudin’s character. However, Munna Michael was highly unsuccessful at the box office.

Khan's next film was Nikamma, is a 2022 Indian Hindi-language action comedy film starring Abhimanyu Dassani, Shirley Setia, and Shilpa Shetty. It was a remake of MCA. It received overwhelmingly negative reviews from both the critics and audience. The film was highly unsuccessful at the box office.

Filmography

References

External links 
 
 Sabbir Khan, Filmography at Bollywood Hungama
 Kambakkht Ishq, website

21st-century Indian film directors
1976 births
Living people
Hindi-language film directors